The 2020 Clare Senior Football Championship was the 125th staging of the Clare Senior Football Championship since its establishment by the Clare County Board in 1887. The championship was postponed indefinitely due to the coronavirus pandemic in Ireland. The draw for the opening round fixtures eventually took place on 1 July 2020. The championship began on 1 August 2020 and is scheduled to end in September 2020.

The 2020 champions, and holders of the Jack Daly Cup are Kilmurry-Ibrickane who won their sixteenth overall title.

Format Change
Time constraints led to a revision of the championship format. The group stages were abolished and any amalgamations withdrawn. The championship saw six first-round games with the winners of these ties being drawn against each other in the quarter final stage. The losers of the first round faced off against each other in order to produce one semi-finalist. Open draws applied to all rounds. There will be no relegation.

Senior Championship Fixtures

First round
 Six winners advance to Quarter-Finals
 Six losers move to Round 2

-

Second round
 Played by six losers of Round 1
 Three winners advance to Round 3

The original fixture between Clondegad and Cratloe was postponed due to an outbreak of COVID-19 within both the Cratloe and Clondegad GAA communities. After an emergency meeting of the Clare County Board it was agreed to postpone any game that the Cratloe Senior and Junior, and Clondegad Junior teams were due to play by a period of two weeks. All subsequent games involving these clubs or their conquerors would also be delayed down the line due to this decision. This would allow sufficient time for those affected to recover before returning to play.

Third round
 Played by three winners of Round 2
 Draw to decide which team gets bye direct to Round 3B
 Winner of Round 3B advances to Semi-Finals 
 Loser of Round 3A moves to Senior B Championship

Quarter-finals
 Played by six winners of Round 1
 Three winners of this round advance to Semi-Finals
 Three losers move to Senior B Championship

Semi-finals
 Played by three winners of Quarter-Finals and winner of Round 3B

2020 County Final

Other Fixtures

Senior B Championship 
 Played by three losers of Quarter-Finals and loser of Round 3A

The original fixture between Éire Óg and Ennistymon was not played due to a dispute over the fixture. A decision on whether a re-fixture will be played or the title awarded to the team that actually showed up is pending an emergency meeting of the Clare County Board.

References

Clare Senior Football Championship
Clare
Clare